Yulia Anatoliyivna Prokopchuk (also transliterated Yuliia or Iuliia; born 23 October 1986) is a retired Ukrainian diver. She has won seven gold medals at the European Championships and two medals (silver and bronze) at the World Championships.

Career 
Prokopchuk participated in the 10 m platform event at the 2008 Summer Olympics.

With her partner, Viktoriya Potyekhina, she won the silver medal in the 10 m synchro event of the European Aquatics Championships. A few months later, Prokopchuk appeared at the 2012 Summer Olympics, competing in the 10 m platform event and in the 10 m platform synchronized event with Potyekhina.

Prokopchuk won bronze in the 10 m platform event at the 2013 World Championships and silver in the team event at the 2015 World Championships.

She finished 14th in the 10 m platform event at the 2016 Summer Olympics in Rio de Janeiro.

References

External links 
 
 

1986 births
Living people
Ukrainian female divers
Olympic divers of Ukraine
Divers at the 2008 Summer Olympics
Divers at the 2012 Summer Olympics
Divers at the 2016 Summer Olympics
World Aquatics Championships medalists in diving
Universiade medalists in diving
Universiade bronze medalists for Ukraine
Medalists at the 2009 Summer Universiade
People from Ukrayinka
Sportspeople from Kyiv Oblast
21st-century Ukrainian women